The 2007 Uzbek League season was the 16th edition of top-level football in Uzbekistan since independence from the Soviet Union in 1992.

Overview
It was contested by 16 teams, and Pakhtakor Tashkent won the championship.

League table

Season statistics

Top goalscorers

Last updated: 6 December 2007

References
Uzbekistan - List of final tables (RSSSF)

Uzbekistan Super League seasons
1
Uzbek
Uzbek